The che dian chong is a breech-loading, cartridge-using musket invented by Zhao Shizhen (趙士禎) during the Ming dynasty for the dynasty's arsenals. Like all early breech loading fireams, gas leakage was a limitation and danger present in the weapon's mechanism. 

The zi mu chong is also a breech loading musket, the earliest breech-loader musket known. It was indigenously developed in China in the late 16th century.

References

Muskets
Firearms of China